This is a list of Swedish television related events from 1994.

Events
Unknown - The first season of Sikta mot stjärnorna was won by Olle Nilsson performing as John Lennon.
7 September - Long running Australian soap opera Prisoner: Cell Block H is transmitted on television screens and homes across Sweden for the first time ever. The series will begin airing on TV4.

Debuts

Domestic
9 September - Sikta mot stjärnorna (1994-2002), a series hosted by Lasse Holm in which members of the public impersonate their favourite singers.

International
7 September -  Prisoner: Cell Block H (1979-1986) (TV4)

Changes of network affiliation

Television series
1 October-17 December - Bert
1–24 December - Håll huvudet kallt

Ending this year

Births

Deaths

See also

1994 in Sweden

References